For Your Consideration is a 2006 American comedy film directed by Christopher Guest. It was co-written by Guest and Eugene Levy, and both also star in the film. The film's title is a phrase used in trade advertisements to promote films for honors such as the Academy Awards. The plot revolves around a group of three actors who learn that their performances in the fictional film they have not even completed yet, Home for Purim, a drama set in the mid-1940s American South, are supposedly generating a great deal of award-season buzz.

Many in the cast appeared in Guest's previous films Waiting for Guffman, Best in Show, and A Mighty Wind, including Levy, Catherine O'Hara, Parker Posey, Harry Shearer, Michael McKean, Fred Willard, Larry Miller, Bob Balaban, Jennifer Coolidge, Jane Lynch, Ed Begley Jr., Michael Hitchcock, John Michael Higgins and Jim Piddock. Ricky Gervais, the co-creator of the original British television series The Office, also appears, while Paul Dooley, John Krasinski, Richard Kind, Scott Adsit, and Sandra Oh make brief cameos. Though the dialogue is largely improvised by the actors as in Guest's earlier films, the format is a departure from the mockumentary style.

The film received its World Premiere at the Toronto International Film Festival on September 10, 2006. It was produced by Warner Independent Pictures in association with Castle Rock Entertainment and Shangri-La Entertainment.

Plot
The film follows the production of Home for Purim, a low-budget drama film about a Jewish family in the southern United States in the 1940s. The cast consists of character actress Marilyn Hack as the family's dying matriarch; veteran actor turned kosher hot dog mascot Victor Allen Miller as her husband; ingénue Callie Webb as their lesbian daughter, whose return home with her girlfriend serves as the driving plot of Home for Purim; and Brian Chubb, who is dating Webb, as their son.

The film's director constantly incorporates bizarre camera shots and acting notes, while the producer, heiress to a diaper service, knows nothing about producing films. The two screenwriters are at odds with the director, as they struggle to align the film's period Southern setting with incongruous Jewish references and words.
 
When an unattributed rumor begins to circulate that Hack, Miller, and Webb are likely to receive Oscar nominations for the film, each begins obsessing about the award. Hack pretends not to care while secretly pining for the award, Miller demands a higher salary and pushes his agent for more dignified work, and Webb breaks up with Chubb. Later, the hosts of entertainment news program Hollywood Now visit the set and interview the cast.

The studio intervenes in the production of Home for Purim and, deeming the film to be "too Jewish," re-title it Home for Thanksgiving. Despite this, the Oscar buzz around the film intensifies, and the three prospective nominees begin to make press appearances to promote the film. Miller appears on a hip-hop teen show called Chillaxin''' in youthful attire with capped teeth, a tan, and dyed blonde hair. Hack gets breast implants and extensive plastic surgery to the point where her face is comically ecstatic. Webb goes on a shock jock radio show, only to field questions exclusively about her nude scenes.

The Academy Award nominations are announced, and only Chubb (who sleeps through the morning of the announcement) is nominated. Miller returns to auditioning for commercials. Webb attempts to revive her failed one-woman show, No Penis Intended. Hack makes a drunken rant on Hollywood Now and becomes an acting teacher, having uncomfortably made peace with her mediocre career.

Cast

Catherine O'Hara as Marilyn Hack
Ed Begley Jr. as Sandy Lane
Eugene Levy as Morley Orfkin
Harry Shearer as Victor Allan Miller
Christopher Guest as Jay Berman
John Michael Higgins as Corey Taft
Jim Piddock as Simon Whitset
Jennifer Coolidge as Whitney Taylor Brown
Parker Posey as Callie Webb
Rachael Harris as Debbie Gilchrist
Christopher Moynihan as Brian Chubb
Paul Dooley as Paper Badge Sgt.
John Krasinski as Paper Badge Officer
Don Lake as "Love It" critic Ben Lilly
Michael Hitchcock as "Hate It" critic David van Zyverdan
Sandra Oh as Marketing Person
Richard Kind as Marketing Person
Bob Balaban as Philip Koontz
Michael McKean as Lane Iverson
Ari Graynor as Young PA
Scott Adsit as First AD
Simon Helberg as Junior Agent
Kevin Sussman as Commercial Director
Fred Willard as Chuck
Jane Lynch as Cindy
Jordan Black as Whitney's Assistant 
Nina Conti as Weather Woman
Mary McCormack as Pilgrim Woman
Shawn Christian as Pilgrim Man
Deborah Theaker as Liz Fenneman
Ricky Gervais as Martin Gibb
Larry Miller as Syd Finkleman
Craig Bierko as Talk Show Host
Loudon Wainwright as Nominee Ben Connelly
Jessica St. Clair as Hula Balls Spokeswoman
Casey Wilson as Young Actress
Derek Waters as Young Actor

Reception
Critical reception
Based on 162 reviews collected by the film review aggregator Rotten Tomatoes, 52% of critics gave For Your Consideration'' a positive review, with an average rating of 5.90/10. The critical consensus reads: "As the object of satire gets bigger the jokes become thinner, and Christopher Guest isn't as droll or insightful here than when he was lampooning smaller subjects." Leonard Maltin gave the film three stars, describing it as "uncanny in its dead-on parodies of TV and radio talk shows and other follies of show business”.

Awards
Catherine O'Hara won the National Board of Review's Best Supporting Actress award and was nominated for an Independent Spirit Award in the category of Best Female Lead.  O'Hara's performance earned many good reviews, spurring for a short time rumors that, in an ironic twist, she could be nominated for an Academy Award.  In the end, the film did not receive any Academy Award nominations.

See also

List of films featuring fictional films

References

External links
 
 
 
 
 
 Review by Seamus Sweeney at www.nthposition.com

2006 films
American comedy films
Films about actors
Lesbian-related films
Castle Rock Entertainment films
Shangri-La Entertainment films
Warner Independent Pictures films
Icon Productions films
Films directed by Christopher Guest
Films with screenplays by Christopher Guest
Films with screenplays by Eugene Levy
Purim
Films about Jews and Judaism
Films about Hollywood, Los Angeles
2006 comedy films
2000s English-language films
2000s American films